Osman Hassan Ali Atto (1940 – August 5, 2013), also spelled Ato, was a controversial Somali businessman, faction leader, and politician affiliated with the Somali National Alliance.

Early life and career

Somali Civil War
 Atto was the khat industry leader during the early 1990s, when he was second in command to Mohammed Farah Aidid. Aidid thus became the strongest faction leader.

Atto was captured by Task Force Ranger on September 21, 1993, from a location near Digfer Hospital. The Rangers had made an earlier attempt at Atto's capture, but missed him by seconds. In a speech at a church in Daytona, in January 2002, William Boykin, responsible for the operation, recounted, "There was a man in Mogadishu named Osman Atto... He went on CNN and he laughed at us, and he said, 'They'll never get me because Allah will protect me.'" The arrest was later portrayed in the 2001 film Black Hawk Down. In an interview with the BBC, Atto indicated that many aspects of the movie are factually incorrect. He took exception with the ostentatious character chosen to portray him; Atto does not look like the actor who portrayed him, smoke cigars, or wear earrings, facts which were later confirmed by SEAL Team Six sniper Howard E. Wasdin in his 2012 memoirs. Wasdin also indicated that while the character in the movie ridiculed his captors, Atto in reality seemed concerned that Wasdin and his men had been sent to kill rather than apprehend him. Atto additionally stated that he was not consulted about the project or approached for permission, and that the film sequence re-enacting his arrest contained several inaccuracies: "First of all when I was caught on 21 September, I was only travelling with one Fiat 124, not three vehicles as it shows in the film... And when the helicopter attacked, people were hurt, people were killed... The car we were travelling in, and I have got proof, it was hit at least 50 times. And my colleague Ahmed Ali was injured on both legs... I think it was not right, the way they portrayed both the individual and the action. It was not right.

On July 9, 1994 the Lower Jubba Peace Conference led to a peace agreement signed by Atto as the Somali National Alliance (SNA) representative and by general Hersi Morgan of the Somali National Front (SNF). However, Hersi Morgan's adversaries in Lower Jubba, the Absame clan, did not take part, making the peace accord stillborn. In late 1994, Atto's car drove over a land mine and broke both his feet.

War against Aidid
 The U.S. Department of State asserted, in its Country Report for Somalia for the year 2000, that the killing of Yusuf Tallan, a former general under the Barre regime, was connected to Atto. The report did not provide specific corroboration for the assertion.

Militiamen loyal to Atto are also alleged to be responsible for a July 14, 2001, ambush of a World Food Programme (WFP) relief convoy near Mogadishu, in which six persons were killed.

In 2004, the Chairman of the Security Council Committee described Atto as an individual who exemplifies "the interaction between looting and the exploitation of Somalia's resources and infrastructure and the financing of warfare".

Transitional Federal Government (TFG)
 On May 30 he was kidnapped by the ICU, who were waging an insurgency against the Ethiopian troops and the Somali government soldiers. Atto was kidnapped by insurgents manning a checkpoint while he was driving to Mogadishu. The Islamic Courts later released him. On August 5, 2013, Atto died of natural causes at his Mogadishu residence.

Airports and checkpoints

See also
United Somali Congress
Hussein Mohamed Farrah
Musa Sudi Yalahow
Transitional Federal Parliament

References

External links
"In Somalia, a Chameleon Thrives" by Donatella Lorch, The New York Times, Monday July 31, 1995]
"Letter from Mogadishu, a world of dust" by William Finnegan, The New Yorker, March 20, 1995. (interview with Atto begin sixth paragraph from the bottom)
http://www.africa.upenn.edu/Newsletters/HB7895_SOM.html
warlord_threatens_peace_force_in_somalia
https://web.archive.org/web/20061118055427/http://www.netnomad.com/atobio.html
Somalis Try to Avert Showdown http://transcripts.cnn.com/TRANSCRIPTS/0201/17/se.06.html Transcript of interview with Atto by C. Amanpour on CNN, aired 17 Jan. 2002 20.00 ET
BBC News Analysis: Somalia's powerbrokers, January 8, 2002 Includes picture of Atto.
Land of the Gun, interview with Atto by Kevin Sites, Yahoo News, 29 September 2005

1940 births
2013 deaths
Somalian faction leaders
Somalian prisoners and detainees
Prisoners and detainees of the United States military
Members of the Transitional Federal Parliament
Somali National Alliance politicians
Battle of Mogadishu (1993)